Mauretania Comics is an independent comic, originally published by Paul Harvey and Chris Reynolds. Reynolds' main character is the mysterious 'Monitor', a strange helmeted figure, while Harvey's is the more blatant 'Mincer'. The stories are mainly quiet, distant pieces, as if peering into other people's lives. A Chris Reynolds graphic novel simply entitled Mauretania was commissioned by Penguin Books in 1990. Though an original story made up the bulk of the volume, Mauretania also reprinted several of Reynolds' short stories from Mauretania Comics. Harvey is now one of the Stuckist painters.

External links
 The Mauretania Comics website

Comic book publishing companies of the United Kingdom
Comics publications